Miguel Román (born 14 November 1985) is a Mexican professional boxer.

Professional career
On March 12, 2011 he lost to Jonathan Victor Barros for the WBA Featherweight belt.

On January 28, 2017 in a Fight-of-the-Year candidate he had his 18 fight win streak snapped by Takashi Miura in a title eliminator for the WBC super featherweight title. He was knocked out in the 12th round of the fight.

On December 9, 2017 Miguel faced fellow battle hardened Mexican warrior Orlando Salido. Roman dropped Salido three times — in Rounds 4, 8 and 9 — en route to a ninth-round mercy stoppage by referee Robert Byrd. However, right up until the end came at 1:43 of Round 9, the 37-year-old war horse gave as good as he got in the kind of back-and-forth slugfest that he has become known for.

On November 3, 2018, Roman challenged Miguel Berchelt for his WBC super featherweight belt, in what was Berchelt's third title defense. Roman was at the top of his game throughout the fight, but just wasn't able to match Berchelt's size, power and skill. Berchelt dropped Roman three times throughout the fight, but despite that Roman kept going forward, even taunting Berchet at one point to come forward. However, in the ninth round, after the third time Vazquez was dropped, the referee had seen enough and the fight was stopped.

He bounced back from the loss by defeating Ramiro Blanco via a twelve-round unanimous decision.

In his next fight, Roman faced fellow Mexican Tomas Rojas. In a very entertaining and fast-paced fight, both fighters didn't take a step back and gave the fans a real show. Roman was aggressive and hurting Rojas throughout the fight, but Rojas did his fair share of damage on Roman too. In the end, Roman's aggression was sufficient for all three judges to name him the winner, 117-111, 117-112 and 116-112.

Professional boxing record

References

External links

1985 births
Boxers from Chihuahua (state)
Living people
Mexican male boxers
Featherweight boxers
Sportspeople from Ciudad Juárez